Paul Swiston (born May 26, 1989 in Calgary, Alberta) is a professional Canadian football offensive lineman who is currently a free agent. In the CFL’s Amateur Scouting Bureau final rankings, he was ranked as the 15th best player for players eligible in the 2011 CFL Draft, and 10th by players in the CIS. Swiston was selected in the 4th round, 24th overall by the Winnipeg Blue Bombers and was signed to a contract on May 27, 2011. He was released by the Blue Bombers on October 24, 2014. Swiston signed with the Stampeders on February 17, 2015. He played CIS football with the Calgary Dinos.

References

1989 births
Living people
Players of Canadian football from Alberta
Canadian football offensive linemen
Calgary Dinos football players
Canadian football people from Calgary
Winnipeg Blue Bombers players
Calgary Stampeders players